Alexey Kunshin (born 20 October 1987) is a Russian former professional racing cyclist.

Major results
2007
1st Overall Way to Pekin
1st Stages 1, 2 & 3
2012
1st Overall Volta ao Alentejo
1st Stage 2

References

External links

1987 births
Living people
Russian male cyclists
Place of birth missing (living people)